Walter Padgett (1867 – 4 May 1929) was a British sports shooter. He competed at the 1908 Summer Olympics winning a silver medal in the team military rifle event.

References

1867 births
1929 deaths
British male sport shooters
Olympic shooters of Great Britain
Shooters at the 1908 Summer Olympics
Olympic silver medallists for Great Britain
Olympic medalists in shooting
Medalists at the 1908 Summer Olympics
Sportspeople from Kingston upon Hull
20th-century British people